Henry Gale (11 July 1836 – 3 March 1898) was an English first-class cricketer. A right-handed batsman, he made his debut in 1865 for Hampshire against local rivals Middlesex, during which Gale made his highest career score of 44. Gale played in five first-class matches for the club between from 1865 to 1866, the last of which came against Surrey.

In his six matches Gale made 144 runs at an average of 16.00.

Gale played his final first-class match for the Gentlemen in the Gentlemen v Players fixture. The Gentlemen side featured W.G. Grace who made 173*. Gale himself was dismissed for a duck in the Gentlemen's innings.

Gale died in Westbourne, Hampshire on 3 March 1898.

External links
Henry Gale at Cricinfo
Henry Gale at CricketArchive

1836 births
1898 deaths
Cricketers from Winchester
English cricketers
Hampshire cricketers
Gentlemen of the South cricketers